Whetu Taewa (born 19 October 1970) is a New Zealand former professional rugby league footballer who represented New Zealand six times between 1989 and 1996.

Playing career

New Zealand
Whetu was born on the West Coast, New Zealand and started playing rugby league there; all grades up to the West Coast Representative side. In 1987 he made the New Zealand under 17's training squad and also débuted in the West Coast rugby union side. Taewa made the Junior Kiwis in 1988. In 1989 he moved to Christchurch and played for the Hallswell club. This was the year he first made the New Zealand national rugby league team, joining their tour to Great Britain. From 1990 to 1993 he was part of the successful Canterbury side of the era and again joined the Kiwis on the 1993 tour of Great Britain and France. He played 4 games for the West Coast and 37 games for Canterbury. He played in the 1992 Pacific Cup for the New Zealand Māori side. In 1993 he was invited to be part of an Auckland Invitational XIII side that drew 16-all with the Balmain Tigers.

Australian Rugby League
In 1994 he signed with the Auckland Warriors who were to be a new team in the Australian Rugby League premiership. He moved up to Auckland and played for the Counties Manukau Heroes in the Lion Red Cup that year and represented Auckland in their Rugby League Cup challenge. In 1995 he was in the inaugural run on side for the Warriors in their first match against the Brisbane Broncos. 
However, in 1996 he was released from the club and he joined the North Queensland Cowboys. Taewa toured PNG in 1996 with the New Zealand Māori.

England
In 1997 he joined the Sheffield Eagles in the Super League competition. Taewa played  in Sheffield Eagles' 17–8 victory over Wigan in the 1998 Challenge Cup Final during Super League III at Wembley Stadium, London on Saturday 2 May 1998.

In 1999 he joined the Hull Kingston Rovers who played in the Northern Ford Premiership, the division below the Super League. He became the captain in 2000, before retiring at the end of the 2002 season.

Coaching and later years
In 2003 he was an assistant coach for Hull Kingston Rovers before he returned home to New Zealand. Taewa left Hull KR after a family friend fell ill in New Zealand. He now resides in Cromwell.

Honours
As Taewa represented the New Zealand national rugby league team while playing for the Haswell club, he was rewarded with Honorary life membership at the club.

Sources

External links 
 (archived by web.archive.org) Hull Kingston Rovers ~ Captains

1970 births
Living people
Auckland rugby league team players
Canterbury rugby league team players
Counties Manukau rugby league team players
Halswell Hornets players
Hull Kingston Rovers captains
Hull Kingston Rovers players
Junior Kiwis players
New Zealand Māori rugby league team players
New Zealand national rugby league team players
New Zealand rugby league coaches
New Zealand rugby league players
New Zealand rugby union players
New Zealand Warriors players
North Queensland Cowboys players
Rugby league centres
Rugby league players from West Coast, New Zealand
Rugby league wingers
Rugby union centres
Sheffield Eagles (1984) players
Suburbs (West Coast) players
West Coast rugby league team players